Ileana Benita Beltrán Zulueta (born May 24, 1971 in Havana, Ciudad de la Habana) is a retired female judoka from Cuba. She twice competed for her native country at the Summer Olympics in the Women's Half-Middleweight (– 61 kg) division: 1992 and 1996. Beltrán twice won a gold medal at the Pan American Games during her career.

References
 

1971 births
Living people
Judoka at the 1992 Summer Olympics
Judoka at the 1996 Summer Olympics
Judoka at the 1991 Pan American Games
Judoka at the 1995 Pan American Games
Sportspeople from Havana
Cuban female judoka
Pan American Games gold medalists for Cuba
Pan American Games medalists in judo
Olympic judoka of Cuba
Medalists at the 1991 Pan American Games
20th-century Cuban women
20th-century Cuban people
21st-century Cuban women